Gaia Bermani Amaral (born 16 September 1980) is a Brazilian-Italian actress, model and television presenter.

Life and career 
Born in São Paulo, the daughter of a Brazilian fashion photographer and an Italian model, at young age Bermani Amaral moved with her family to Milan, where she studied at the Liceo classico Giuseppe Parini and later started working as a model and a spokesperson. She became first known in 2000, after appearing in a series of commercials for TIM. In 2001 she hosted the Rai 2 cinema magazine Stracult and made her debut as an actress in a stage adaptation of Sabrina.  Bermani Amaral made her film debut in 2005, in Roberto Faenza's I giorni dell'abbandono.  She later appeared in several TV-series and films.

Filmography

Films

Television

References

External links 
 
 

Italian film actresses
Italian television actresses
1980 births
People from São Paulo
Living people
21st-century Italian actresses
Brazilian emigrants to Italy